Paul Hermann may refer to:

 Paul Hermann (botanist) (1646–1695), German botanist
 Paul Hermann (composer) or Pál Hermann (1902–1944), Hungarian composer and cellist of Jewish heritage possibly murdered by the Nazis
 Paul Hermann (1905–1958), author of Sieben vorbei und acht verweht - Das Abenteuer der frühen Entdeckungen, translated by Michael Bullock
 Paul Hermann (1904–1970), Nazi-era lyricist who revised the text of traditional Christian carol "Es ist für uns eine Zeit angekommen" to secular military lyrics

See also
 Paul Herman (disambiguation)
 Paul Herrmann (born 1985), German short-track speed-skater
 Hermann Paul (1846–1921), German linguist and lexicographer
 Paule Herreman (1919–1991), Belgian actress 
 Hermann (name), a surname and given name (including a list of people with the name)